WKEU AM 1450 is a radio station broadcasting an oldies format. Licensed to serve Griffin, Georgia, United States, it serves the south metro Atlanta area.  The station is currently owned by Wlt & Associates, and features programming from ABC Radio and Westwood One.

The station is an affiliate of the Atlanta Braves radio network, the largest radio affiliate network in Major League Baseball.

History
WKEU became an affiliate of the Mutual Broadcasting System on March 15, 1944.

References

External links

KEU
Griffin, Georgia
1933 establishments in Georgia (U.S. state)
Radio stations established in 1933